Vâlcele may refer to several places in Romania:

 Vâlcele, Covasna, a commune in Covasna County
 Vâlcele, Olt, a commune in Olt County
 Vâlcele, a village in Merișani Commune, Argeș County
 Vâlcele, a village in Corbasca Commune, Bacău County
 Vâlcele, a village in Suplacu de Barcău Commune, Bihor County
 Vâlcele, a village in Brăești, Botoșani
 Vâlcele, a village in Ulmeni, Buzău
 Vâlcele, a village in Bobâlna, Cluj
 Vâlcele, a village in Feleacu Commune, Cluj County
 Vâlcele, a village in Bretea Română Commune, Hunedoara County
 Vâlcele, a village in Stroieşti Commune, Suceava County
 Vâlcele, a village in Oșești Commune, Vaslui County
 Vâlcele, a village in Câmpineanca Commune, Vrancea County
 Vâlcele, a district in the town of Târgu Ocna, Bacău County
 Vâlcele, a district in the town of Negru Vodă, Constanţa County
 Vâlcele, a district in the town of Tismana, Gorj County
 rivers in Romania:
 Vâlcele (Olt), a tributary of the Olt in Covasna County
 Vâlcele, a tributary of the Trotuș in Bacău County